A pilgrim's hat, cockel hat or traveller's hat is a wide brim hat used to keep off the sun.

Background
The pilgrim's hat traditionally had a scallop shell emblem. This is thought to be a  reference to the Christian legend that, after Saint James died in Jerusalem, he was miraculously carried by angels to the Atlantic coast of Spain, although the shell symbol has also been connected to pre-Christian traditions as well.  

Traditionally it is highly associated with pilgrims on the Way of St. James. The upturned brim of the hat is adorned with a scallop shell to denote the traveller's pilgrim status, although modern walkers wear it much less.

Gallery
Pilgrim's hats are used in heraldry.

See also
Pilgrim badge
Pilgrim's staff
Cross of Saint James
Asian conical hat

External links

References

Camino de Santiago
Headgear
Hats
Heraldic charges
Religious headgear